"You Need Love" is a song by Styx written by Dennis DeYoung. Following the success of the 1974 re-release of the single "Lady" from the album Styx II, "You Need Love" from that album was released as a follow-up single.

Cash Box said "with a dynamite synthesizer-guitar-rhythm-vocal intro leading the way, Styx explodes with lightning-quick guitar work and a slick pace that breaks it all up" and praised the guitar solos and organ passage.  Record World said that "Guitar virtuosity melds with [Styx'] brilliant vocal harmonies, adding further excitement to their burgeoning career."

Personnel
James Young: lead vocals, lead guitar
Dennis DeYoung: keyboards, backing vocals
John Curulewski: rhythm guitar, backing vocals
Chuck Panozzo: bass guitar
John Panozzo: drums

Chart
US Billboard Singles: #88

References

1975 singles
Songs written by Dennis DeYoung
Styx (band) songs
1972 songs